Massylaea is a genus of air-breathing land snails, a pulmonate gastropod in the subfamily Helicinae of the family Helicidae, the typical snails.

It contains the following species:
 Massylaea massylaea (Morelet, 1851)
 Massylaea punica (Morelet, 1851)
Species brought into synonymy
 Massylaea bisseyana Pallary, 1933: synonym of Loxana rerayana (Mousson, 1873) (original combination)
 Massylaea bournazeliana Pallary, 1933: synonym of Loxana lechatelieri (Pallary, 1917) (original combination)
 Massylaea constantina (E. Forbes, 1838): synonym of Eobania constantina (E. Forbes, 1838)
 Massylaea derbesi Pallary, 1933: synonym of Loxana rerayana (Mousson, 1873) (original combination)
 Massylaea rerayana (Mousson, 1873): synonym of Loxana rerayana (Mousson, 1873) (superseded generic combination)
 Massylaea severinae Pallary, 1918: synonym of Loxana severinae (Pallary, 1918)
 Massylaea vermiculata (O. F. Müller, 1774): synonym of Eobania vermiculata (O. F. Müller, 1774)

References 

 Morelet, A., 1851. Appendice à la Conchyliologie de l'Algérie; descriptions d'espèces nouvelles. Journal de Conchyliologie 2: 351-361
 Bank, R. A. (2017). Classification of the Recent terrestrial Gastropoda of the World. Last update: July 16th, 2017

External links
 

Helicidae
Gastropod genera